The Tereshchenko Cabinet was the composition of the government of Kazakhstan from 16 October 1991 to 12 October 1994 under the leadership of Prime Minister Sergey Tereshchenko. The cabinet ceased to exist after the Supreme Soviet of Kazakhstan passed a vote of no-confidence in May 1994. Despite that, Tereshchenko still held the post for a couple of months until he was finally dismissed by President Nursultan Nazarbayev on 12 October following a corruption scandal by the Minister of Internal Affairs.

Composition

References

Tereshchenko
1991 establishments in Kazakhstan
Tereshchenko
Tereshchenko